Love Songs is a compilation album by Trisha Yearwood, and was released by Universal Distribution in January 2008. It features 14 love songs from her career. It peaked at #35 on Top Country Albums chart.

Track listing

"That's What I Like About You" (John Hadley, Kevin Welch, Wally Wilson) - 2:39
"She's in Love with the Boy" (Jon Ims) - 4:06
"Down on My Knees" (Beth Nielsen Chapman) - 3:55
"I Don't Fall in Love So Easy" (Rodney Crowell) - 4:15
"If I Ain't Got You" (Trey Bruce, Craig Wiseman) - 3:03
"The Nightingale" (Jude Johnstone) - 3:50
"Thinkin' About You" (Bob Regan, Tom Shapiro) - 3:25
"Maybe It's Love" (Chapman, Annie Roboff) - 5:04
"Powerful Thing" (Sunny Russ, Stephony Smith) - 2:58
"I'll Still Love You More" (Diane Warren) - 4:22
"One Love" (Al Anderson, Gary Nicholson, Kimmie Rhodes) - 4:23
"Love Alone" (Dan Colehour, David Grissom) - 4:19
"Baby Don't You Let Go" (Jessi Alexander, Austin Cunningham, Sonya Isaacs) - 2:45
"Sweet Love" (Tia Sillers, Wiseman) - 3:44

Chart performance

References

2008 compilation albums
MCA Records compilation albums
Trisha Yearwood compilation albums